Foulridge railway station served the village of Foulridge in Lancashire, England. It was built by the Leeds and Bradford Extension Railway, (later absorbed by the Midland Railway) and opened on 2 October 1848.

The station closed on 5 January 1959.  The station building was subsequently dismantled brick-by-brick and re-erected at Ingrow West railway station on the heritage Keighley and Worth Valley Railway.

The line serving it remained in use until February 1970, when it was closed to all traffic and subsequently dismantled.

References

Disused railway stations in the Borough of Pendle
Former Midland Railway stations
Railway stations in Great Britain closed in 1959
Railway stations in Great Britain opened in 1848